Thomas Werner Laurie (1866–1944) was a London publisher of books that were avant-garde in some cases, racy in others.

Early life
Laurie was born in Edinburgh. His father was a Scot and his mother a German.

Career
He founded his T. Werner Laurie Ltd. publishing house in 1904 and was known for publishing the works of Yeats, Wilde, and Moore as well as other authors of lesser renown.

He published The Jungle by Upton Sinclair when that work had been rejected for publication in England by other publishers, and Sinclair stayed with Laurie for many years in gratitude, publishing World's End and other novels in Sinclair's Lanny Budd series.

Other books issued in the firm's eclectic publishing programme included The Encyclopaedia of Sex and The History of Torture through the Ages.

In 1946, after Laurie's death, his publishing firm was purchased by the financier Clarence Hatry and it continued to operate in premises above Hatchards booksellers at 187 Piccadilly, London, with George Greenfield as the manager.

Book series published by T. Werner Laurie Ltd.
 The Cathedral Series (author of each volume: T. Francis Bumpus)
 Classical Library
 Eclectic Library (also known as: T. Werner Laurie's Eclectic Library: Books for the Household)
 The Farmer's Library
 The Garden Booklets<ref>Publisher's advertisement in closing pages of: Adele and Thomas Seltzer, trs., Atlantis: A Novel by Gerhardt Hauptmann, London: T. Werner Laurie, 1920. Retrieved 20 January 2021.</ref> 
 The House Decoration Series
 Laurie's Half-Crown Net Novels
 Laurie's Shilling (Net) Books
 Laurie's Shilling Reprints
 Laurie's Two-Shillings Net Novels
 The Leather Booklets
 The Library of Sports
 The Music Lover's Library
 Old English Towns
 Sixpenny Books
 The Old Time Booklets
 Sex Education Library (also known as: The Library of Sex Education)
 Uniform Library Edition of the Works of Guy de Maupassant
 Uniform Library Edition of the Works of Pierre Loti

Personal life
Thomas Werner Laurie married twice. His second wife was (Elizabeth Mary) Beatrice (born 1895). Their daughter, Joan Werner Laurie (1920–1964), edited She'', a periodical for women.

References

External links
W. B. Yeats and "A Vision": Prospectus at www.yeatsvision.com
Cover Art from Selected Books by M.P. Shiel at www.alangullette.com

1866 births
1944 deaths
British publishers (people)